The 2011 Ukrainian Figure Skating Championships took place between December 21 and 23, 2010 in Kyiv. Skaters competed in the disciplines of men's singles, ladies' singles, pair skating, and ice dancing on the senior level. The results of the competition were used to choose the teams to the 2011 World Championships and the 2011 European Championships.

Results

Men

Ladies

Pairs

Ice dancing

External links
 results

2011
2011 in figure skating
2010 in figure skating
2010 in Ukrainian sport
2011 in Ukrainian sport
December 2010 sports events in Ukraine

ru:Чемпионат Украины по фигурному катанию на коньках 2009